Celaena is a genus of moths of the family Noctuidae.

Species
 Celaena haworthii – Haworth's minor (Curtis, 1829)

References
 Celaena at Markku Savela's Lepidoptera and Some Other Life Forms
 Natural History Museum Lepidoptera genus database

Hadeninae